Richard Lederer (born 10 June 1971), who often performs as Protector, is an Austrian metal musician most notable for being a member in the bands Summoning, Die Verbannten Kinder Evas, and Ice Ages. He also does the artwork for some of the albums that he plays music in.

Discography

With Summoning
Lugburz (full-length, 1995)
Minas Morgul (full-length, 1995)
Dol Guldur (full-length, 1996)
Nightshade Forests (EP, 1997)
Stronghold (full-length, 1999)
Let Mortal Heroes Sing Your Fame (full-length, 2001)
Lost Tales (EP, 2003)
Oath Bound (full-length, 2006)
Old Mornings Dawn (full-length, 2013)
With Doom We Come (full-length, 2018)

With Die Verbannten Kinder Evas
Die Verbannten Kinder Evas (full-length, 1995)
Come Heavy Sleep (full-length, 1997)
In Darkness Let Me Dwell (full-length, 1999)
Dusk and Void Became Alive (full-length, 2006)

With Ice Ages
Strike the Ground (full-length, 1997)
This Killing Emptiness (full-length, 2000)
Buried Silence (full-length, 2008)
Nullify (full-length, 2019)
Vibe of Scorn (full-length, 2021)

With WeltenBrand
Das Nachtvolk (full-length, 1997)

With Whispers in the Shadow
Laudanum (full-length, 1997)
November (full-length, 1999)

With Sanguis et Cinis
Schicksal (full-length, 1996)
Unfreiwillig Abstrakt (EP, 1997)

References

1971 births
Living people
Multi-instrumentalists
Austrian male composers
21st-century Austrian male singers
20th-century Austrian male singers
English-language singers from Austria
Austrian bass guitarists
Austrian keyboardists
Austrian guitarists
Austrian electronic musicians
Summoning (band)
Male bass guitarists
21st-century bass guitarists